Outward Bound Australia (OBA) is the Australian chapter of the not-for-profit organisation Outward Bound International. Since its founding in 1956, Outward Bound Australia has made outdoor education courses available to the community with the aim of developing teamwork skills and raising environmental awareness Australia wide.

Outward Bound's focus on personal and leadership development through outdoor adventure activities has made it popular amongst a diverse array of groups and individuals within the community, over 250,000 Australians aged between 13 and 75 have completed a course. Notably, OBA maintains a number of longstanding relationships with partner schools such as the Cranbrook School in Sydney which has made OBA courses a mandatory part of their school curriculum.

History

OBA's outdoor education courses are based on the principles adopted by German educator Kurt Hahn to train young British seamen to survive in the North Atlantic Ocean during the Second World War.

The first course in Australia was held  in 1956, three years later another course was conducted at Fisherman's Point, on the Hawkesbury River. Warwick Deacock, the first Director of the Outward Bound School, adopted the location as Outward Bound's homebase in Australia until 1973.

Presently, OBA operates from Namadgi National Park in the south western region of the Australian Capital Territory but also conducts courses in the Snowy River National Park (Victoria), Walpole-Nornalup National Park and D'Entrecasteaux National Park (Western Australia), Kosciuszko National Park and Toonumbar National Park (NSW) ranging from 7–26 days in length on offer 12 months a year.

As part of the OBA Manifesto (which details the idea of reaching the community as a whole), scholarship opportunities are available for applicants who demonstrate financial, demographic or socio-economic disadvantage.

Evaluation of long-term program impacts
Outward Bound engaged heavily in research throughout the 1980s and 1990s to design an evaluation procedure that would accurately measure the impact their courses have on participants. Work conducted by James Neill and Garry Richards, especially the Life Effectiveness Questionnaire (LEQ), is a leading tool for the Australian outdoor industry but as of late has to gain widespread popularity worldwide. LEQ aims to measure the impact of a program on student self-perception from the beginning to the end of the experienced based learning program with particular regards to: human capital, self-efficacy, motivation, community participation, and community support.

In 2002 Outward Bound began to deliver its annual Aspiring Leaders program in to measure responses from the communities it had engaged with. Based on LEQ, participants reported a major change in achievement motivation and task leadership.

Corporate programs
Australian companies, such as Boral, use Outward Bound courses as a team building activity for staff and in order to develop leadership skills for those moving into management positions.

The Country Fire Authority has incorporated Outward Bound courses into their annual training calendar for adult and youth volunteer firefighters for 14 years, using the outdoor wilderness based program to enhance team performance in preparation for natural disasters such as the Black Saturday bushfires that engulfed Victoria in early 2009. In a show of support, the Outward Bound alumni program orchestrated the cleanup of a property owned by a Community Relief Centre volunteer worker who lost her home in the fires.

Canberra's Super 14 Rugby team, the Brumbies, participated in an Outward Bound camp and a three-day mountain bike ride to Mount Kosciuszko in 2009 after Stephen Hoiles took over as team captain from Stirling Mortlock earlier in the year, and Andy Friend succeeded Laurie Fisher as head coach in late 2008.

Public programs

With the support of community organisations such as the Lions Clubs and The Smith Family, OBA offer several programs to the general public including one aimed at young adults (Navigator Program), a more physically adventurous course (Pinnacle Program) and a lengthy 26-day adventure course (Summit to Sea) which takes participants from Tharwa in Australia's Capital Territory, to Mount Kosciuszko finally ending up on Victoria's southern coast along the Snowy River.

Schools programs

Public, Catholic and Independent schools across Australia use Outward Bound programs to support curricula. School programs range from a twelve-member group program (such as the one devised for Total Education in Warwick) to sequential full year groups of four hundred plus students that schools such as The Cranbrook School in Sydney conduct annually.

In 2009 OBA partnered with over fifty schools, some of which include:

References
Donnybrook district high school outward bound Matthew Robert Kingsley 2001

External links
Outward Bound Australia homepage

Outward Bound
Educational organisations based in Australia
Organizations established in 1956
1956 establishments in Australia